Thomas Yeh Sheng-nan (born 26 June 1941) is a Taiwanese prelate of the Roman Catholic Church and diplomat of the Holy See.

Biography
Thomas Yeh Sheng-nan was born on 26 June 1941, in Kaohsiung, Taiwan, and was ordained priest on 27 March 1971, for the Diocese of Tainan. He holds a laurea degree in philosophy. In 1972 he was admitted to the Pontifical Ecclesiastical Academy to study diplomacy.

Yeh entered the diplomatic service of the Holy See on 8 March 1976, and served in the Pontifical diplomatic missions in Nicaragua, Sri Lanka, Zambia, Algeria, Iraq, Australia, Senegal and Great Britain. He was promoted to the counselor of nunciature on 8 March 1989.

On 10 November 1998 he was elected Titular Archbishop of Leptis Magna, and at the same time named Apostolic Nuncio to Sri Lanka. His episcopal consecration took place on 20 December 1998; Cardinal Edward Idris Cassidy was the principal consecrator, with archbishops Stanislaus Lo Kuang and Carlo Maria Viganò, as principal co-consecrators.

On 22 April 2004 Yeh was named Apostolic Nuncio to Algeria and Tunisia. He retired in 2015 and was succeeded in Algeria and Tunisia by Luciano Russo in 2016.

Gallery

See also
 List of heads of the diplomatic missions of the Holy See

References

External links

 Thomas Yeh Sheng-nan at Catholic Hierarchy

 

1941 births
20th-century Roman Catholic titular archbishops
21st-century Roman Catholic titular archbishops
Pontifical Ecclesiastical Academy alumni
Apostolic Nuncios to Algeria
Apostolic Nuncios to Sri Lanka
Apostolic Nuncios to Tunisia
Living people
People from Kaohsiung